Homochaeta is a genus of annelids belonging to the family Naididae.

Species:
 Homochaeta naidina Bretscher, 1896

References

Naididae